Chatchie Plantation House, also known as Homewood, is a historic plantation house located along LA 308, about  east of Thibodaux.

The original house, built in 1847, burned near the end of Civil War. The original kitchen, unharmed by fire, was included in the present building. The main gallery has six Doric posts and the house has an unusually large attic space, comprising four rooms and a central hall.

The mansion was added to the National Register of Historic Places on October 25, 1982.

See also
 National Register of Historic Places listings in Lafourche Parish, Louisiana

References

Houses on the National Register of Historic Places in Louisiana
Houses completed in 1868
Houses in Lafourche Parish, Louisiana
Thibodaux, Louisiana
National Register of Historic Places in Lafourche Parish, Louisiana